The 5th Power is a live album by Lester Bowie recorded for the Italian Black Saint label and released in 1978. It was recorded during a concert tour of Europe by Bowie's group "From the Roots to the Source" and features performances by Bowie, Arthur Blythe, Amina Claudine Myers, Malachi Favors and Phillip Wilson.

Reception
The Allmusic review by Michael G. Nastos awarded the album 4 stars, stating, "Creative jazz and a progressive gospel segment. Bowie at his eclectic best. Essential".

Track listing

Personnel
Lester Bowie - trumpet
Arthur Blythe - alto saxophone
Amina Claudine Myers - piano, vocals
Malachi Favors - bass
Phillip Wilson - drums

References

Lester Bowie live albums
1978 live albums
Black Saint/Soul Note live albums